The SS Cabrillo was a wooden passenger steamship operating in Los Angeles County, California during the first half of the 20th Century. The steamship provided transportation between the Port of Los Angeles and the ports of Avalon and Two Harbors on Santa Catalina Island, Channel Islands.

The "Banning Era"
The Banning brothers of Wilmington played a huge role in transportation to the island even before their purchase of it in 1891. The Bannings owned the Wilmington Transportation Company, and provided the steamships used to deliver tourists from Los Angeles to the island's city of Avalon. When they eventually bought the island in 1891, their company had already provided the necessary transportation to Catalina. However, with new technology and a growing population of visitors, steamships were being replaced quite frequently. 

The Banning brothers, who now owned the island, showed even more interest in improving passenger service to Catalina. So they designed two steamships specifically for the Catalina run. The first was the SS Hermosa II, followed by the SS Cabrillo. Once the construction of the Hermosa II was underway, the Bannings soon realized that the ship would not be big enough to accommodate the island's growing tourism. Before the launch of the Hermosa, plans for the construction of the SS Cabrillo had already begun.  On February 15, 1904, early in the morning, the Cabrillo was launched and, at the time, was the finest ship on the run. The Bannings had hoped for a ship that was faster, bigger, and better in every way, and that is just what the Cabrillo was. She could carry up to 1,200 passengers. With a luxurious interior, a social hall, 10 staterooms, and food service on the main deck, the SS Cabrillo immediately became the favorite ship amongst the general public traveling to Catalina.

The "Wrigley Era"
During the turn of the century, the Bannings ran into financial problems with loss of tourism due to World War I and the fire of 1915 that destroyed more than half of Avalon. With failed attempts to rebuild, the Bannings were forced to sell the island in shares. William Wrigley Jr., the inventor of chewing gum, fell in love with the island and bought out all the shares from owners until he owned all of Catalina Island. He soon rebuilt all of Avalon, and Catalina was back in business. During this era, the island was starting to become world known, resulting in a massive increase in tourism. The SS Hermosa II and the SS Cabrillo were not at all ready for what was coming their way. Mr. Wrigley understood this and had a plan that would change Catalina forever.

Sailing with the great whites
William Wrigley Jr. understood the great importance of water transportation to the island. He wanted there to be a balance between comfort, convenience, and magnificence. His plan was to add two more ships to the fleet. 

Both ships were far faster than the Cabrillo, held large ballrooms and could carry close to 2,000 passengers. The SS Cabrillo was then used only for passenger service to the Isthmus at Twin Harbors. With the demise of the SS Hermosa II; the SS Cabrillo, SS Avalon, and SS Catalina were the only steamships to, ever again, be used on the Catalina run.

World War II
With the outbreak of World War II, the island was taken over by the U.S. military, as well as all of the ships of the Wilmington Transportation Company. The SS Avalon was left behind for limited transportation to and from the mainland, while the SS Catalina and SS Cabrillo were taken to San Francisco to serve as troop transports for the San Francisco Port of Embarkation. 

After the war had ended, the SS Catalina was taken back to be used for ferry services to and from the island, while the Cabrillo was purchased by the U.S. Army who operated her until 1947 where she was brought to the Cuttings Wharf in Napa, California.

Current state
The SS Cabrillo was put up for sale, but there were no buyers, so she was left in the Cuttings Wharf. Being stripped of all machinery and any other useful equipment, she was abandoned on the shores of the Napa River, beginning the final chapter of her life. Over the years, she has slowly deteriorated to almost nothing. She has been stripped of her entire superstructure, and today, nothing, if anything, is left but the hull.

See also

External links

References

1904 ships
Ferries of California
Steamships of the United States
Santa Catalina Island (California)
SS Cabrillo
SS Cabrillo
SS Cabrillo